Stenolemus alikakay is a species of assassin bug, family Reduviidae. It was first found in a spider web at Shanping Forest Ecological Science Park, Taiwan. It has later also been found on Ishigaki Island, the Ryukyu Islands, Japan.

References

Reduviidae
Hemiptera of Asia
Insects of Japan
Insects of Taiwan
Fauna of the Ryukyu Islands
Insects described in 2010